The Broad Prize for Urban Education recognized school districts in urban areas for closing the achievement gap and improving the academic performance of low-income and minority students. It was sponsored by the foundation of philanthropist Eli Broad and included $500,000 in college scholarships to graduates from the winning district. The prize was offered from 2002–2014. The prize was suspended as the foundation redirected its resources toward funding charter schools.

Recipients
2002 Houston Independent School District, Texas
2003 Long Beach Unified School District, California
2004 Garden Grove Unified School District, California
2005 Norfolk Public Schools, Virginia
2006 Boston Public Schools, Massachusetts 
2007 New York City Department of Education, New York
2008 Brownsville Independent School District, Texas
2009 Aldine Independent School District, Texas
2010 Gwinnett County Public Schools, Georgia
2011 Charlotte-Mecklenburg Schools, North Carolina
2012 Miami-Dade County Public Schools, Florida
2013 Houston Independent School District, Texas
2014 Gwinnett County Public Schools, Georgia
2014 Orange County Public Schools, Florida
Source:

References

American education awards